The Kunjra (pronounced as Kunjrda or Kunjda) are a Sunni Muslim community found in North India, Central India and Nepal. They are also known as Sabzi Farosh or Mewa Farosh.

History and origin
The Kunjra are a community associated with Farming. The name of the community is derived from Sanskrit word kunj, which means bower. According to Gazetteer Punjab, they claim descent from Raja Kunjpal, the Raja of Kunjah town lies in  the Gujrat district of Punjab province, that is now in Pakistan.

Present circumstances
The community is urban based, and buys vegetables from other communities such as the Kurmi, Murao and Kachhi. They are included in the Other backward caste category in the states of Uttar Pradesh, Madhya Pradesh, Bihar and Delhi.

Distribution
The Kunjra are found throughout North India, with large numbers found in Uttar Pradesh and Madhya Pradesh, mainly in Bhopal (old city), Saugor, Jabalpur, Rajasthan mainly in Jodhpur, Udipur, Bhilwara, Pali, jhunjhunu, churu, and many other cities of Rajasthan etc.  and Khurai.

References

Social groups of Pakistan
Muslim communities of India
Social groups of Uttar Pradesh
Social groups of India
Social groups of Bihar
Social groups of Madhya Pradesh
Muslim communities of Uttar Pradesh